Cyrtinus querci is a species of beetle in the family Cerambycidae. It was described by Howden in 1973. It is known from Honduras and Mexico.

References

Cyrtinini
Beetles described in 1973